Galba cousini is a species of air-breathing freshwater snail, an aquatic pulmonate gastropod mollusk in the family Lymnaeidae, the pond snails.

Description
The length of the shell attains 13.8 mm.

Distribution
This species occurs in the Pacific Ocean off Ecuador.

References

 Pilsbry, H. A. (1935). South American land and freshwater mollusks. 9. Colombian species. Proceedings of the Academy of Natural Sciences of Philadelphia. 87: 83-88.
 Pointier J.P. (ed.). (2015). Freshwater molluscs of Venezuela and their medical and veterinary importance. Harxheim: ConchBooks. 228 pp

External links
 Jousseaume, F., 1887. - Mollusques nouveaux de la république de l'Equateur. Bulletin de la Société Zoologique de France 12: 165-186
 Preston, H.B. (1907). Descriptions of new species of land and freshwater shells from Central and South America. The Annals and Magazine of Natural History, (7) 20 (120): 490-498. London.
 Bargues M. D., Artigas P., Khoubbane M. & Mas-Coma S. (2011). "DNA sequence characterisation and phylogeography of Lymnaea cousini and related species, vectors of fascioliasis in northern Andean countries, with description of L. meridensis n. sp. (Gastropoda: Lymnaeidae)". Parasites & Vectors 4: 132. .

cousini
Gastropods described in 1887